Tom Burroughs (born November 21, 1954) is a Democratic member of the Kansas House of Representatives, representing the 33rd district, and formerly served as the House Minority Leader.  A native of Kansas City, Kansas, he has served since 1997.

Prior to his election, Burroughs ran unsuccessfully for the House in 1990 and 1992. He has an associate degree from Kansas City Community College and spent nearly 30 years working at the Colgate-Palmolive Company.

Burroughs was the chair of the Colgate-Palmolive Employees Credit Union and the Wy-Jo Chapter of Credit Unions.

Committee memberships
During the 2013-2014 Legislative Sessions, Rep. Burroughs served on the following legislative committees:
 Financial Institutions
 General Government Budget (Ranking Member)
 Insurance
 Joint Committee on Legislative Post Audit

Major donors
The top 5 donors to Burroughs's 2008 campaign:
1. Kansas Contractors Assoc 	$1,000 	
2. Kansans for Lifesaving Cures 	$750 	
3. Kansas Bankers Assoc 	$600 	
4. Kansas Assoc of Realtors 	$500 	
5. United Transportation Union $500

References

External links
 Project Vote Smart profile
 Kansas Votes profile
 State Surge - Legislative and voting track record
 Follow the Money campaign contributions:
 1996,1998,2000, 2002, 2004, 2006, 2008

Living people
1954 births
People from Kansas City, Kansas
Democratic Party members of the Kansas House of Representatives
21st-century American politicians
20th-century American politicians